The Tamenglong district of Manipur state has 3 subdivisions. At the time of the 2011 Census of India, it included the present-day Noney district (split in 2016).

Subdivisions 

The Tamenglong district has 3 subdivisons:

 Tamenglong
 Tamei
 Tousem

Towns 

The Tamenglong district has one town:

Villages

Tamenglong subdivision 

The Tamenglong subdivision has following villages:

The following villages do not appear in the 2011 census directory:

 Khangchiulon
 Chiulon
 Kahulong
 Namkaolong
 Duilon
 Phalong
 Luangdi
 Puching
 Guangnam

Tamei subdivision 

The Tamei subdivision has following villages:

The following villages are listed in the 2011 census directory, but do not appear on the district website as of 2023:

 Old Takou (population 1211): Instead, there are two villages called Lower Takou and Upper Takou
 New Kadi (population 451): Instead, there are villages named Kadi II, Kadi III, Kadi IV, and Kadi V

The following villages do not appear in the 2011 census directory:

 Nenluang
 Chaton II
 Kadi-II
 Kadi-III
 Kadi-IV
 Kadi-V
 Kuilong-II
 Kuilong-III
 Nheng
 Lower Takou
 Upper Takou
 New Lemta
 New Thenjang
 Sojamphai
 Tabam
 New Nallong
 Thiujaining
 LC Phai
 Lungmonphai

Tousem subdivision 

The Tousem subdivision has following villages:

The following villages do not appear in the 2011 census directory:

 New Mandu
 Deigie
 Tuisemphai
 Rangkekiulong
 Katang Mbeukam
 Taningjam
 Inpa Nkang (J-Pabram)
 Impa Ningdi
 Taijijang
 Charinapang
 Zeiladjang
 Luangkao
 Tadbung
 Gamphazol
 Pangmol

References 

Tamenglong